Rajendiran is an Indian politician and former Member of the Legislative Assembly of Tamil Nadu. He was elected to the Tamil Nadu legislative assembly as a Pattali Makkal Katchi candidate from Andimadam constituency in 1996 election.

References 

Pattali Makkal Katchi politicians
Living people
Tamil Nadu MLAs 1996–2001
Year of birth missing (living people)